Stefanie Christina Baroness von Pfetten (born November 25, 1973) is a German-Canadian film and television actress.

Early life 
Stefanie von Pfetten was born in Vancouver, British Columbia. Her parents are Baron Hermann von  of German nobility and his third wife, Heidrun Reel. The couple have three daughters.

After high school, she went to Vienna, Austria. Later, she studied art history in Munich, Bavaria. For a short time, she worked for Sotheby's in Vienna. Back in Vancouver, she decided to become an actress.

Acting career 
She is perhaps best known for her roles as Lilly in the sci-fi horror film Decoys, and as Captain Marcia "Showboat" Case in the re-imagined Battlestar Galactica series.

Filmography

Film

Television

References

External links
 
 

1973 births
Living people
Canadian people of German descent
German baronesses
Canadian film actresses
Canadian television actresses
Actresses from Vancouver
20th-century Canadian actresses
21st-century Canadian actresses